Kondlahalli  is a village in the southern state of Karnataka, India. It is located in the Molakalmuru taluk of Chitradurga district in Karnataka.

Demographics
As of 2014 India census, Kondlahalli had a population of 10125 with 5100 males and 5025 females.

See also
 Chitradurga
 Districts of Karnataka

References

External links
 http://Chitradurga.nic.in/

Villages in Chitradurga district